James Harold Wallwork (born September 17, 1930) is an American Republican Party politician who served in both houses of the New Jersey Legislature and twice sought the Republican nomination for Governor.

Early life and military career
Wallwork was born September 17, 1930 in East Orange, New Jersey, the son of J. Harold Wallwork (1904-1985) and Lorraine Cameron Klick Wallwork (1905-1993).  He grew up in Montclair, New Jersey, and was a 1952 graduate of the United States Military Academy at West Point.  He was 13th in his class of 525. He attended the General Staff War College, where he finished first in his class of 400, and the Army Engineering School.  He was the Company Commander of a Combat Engineer Company with the Army of Occupation in Germany.  After he left active duty, he served as a Major in the Army National Guard.

He was an owner of Wallwork Bros., a plumbing, heating and refrigeration supply company, a family business started by his grandfather.

Political career
Wallwork was elected to the Republican County Committee in Montclair in 1957, and served as an aide to Assemblyman C. Robert Sarcone, the Assembly Minority Leader, in 1963. He was later a resident of the Short Hills section of Millburn, New Jersey.

General Assembly
He was elected to the New Jersey General Assembly in 1963, winning one of nine at-large seats. In 1965, he lost his bid for re-election to a second term, the casualty of Democratic Governor Richard J. Hughes's landslide re-election.

State Senate
Wallwork ran for the New Jersey Senate in 1967.  He won a hotly contested primary on a Reform Republican slate, finishing first in a field of thirteen candidates for six Senate seats elected at-Large in Essex County. The General Election turned out to be a strong environment for Republicans; it was the mid-term election of Governor Richard J. Hughes's second term.  Republicans won all six Senate seats, with Wallwork running fourth.  The four Democratic Senators elected in 1965 -- Nicholas Fernicola, John J. Giblin, Maclyn Goldman and Hutchins Inge—were all defeated.

With Republicans taking control of the Legislature in 1967, Wallwork was initially slated to serve as the new Majority Leader.  But the Essex County Republican Chairman, William Yeomans, refused to support him, a move that essentially blackballed Wallwork from the leadership post.  Instead, Frank X. McDermott. a freshman Senator from Union County, became Majority Leader.

1967 Republican State Senate primary results

1967 Essex County state senate general election results

In 1971, redistricting reduced the number of Essex County Senate seats from six to five, all elected At-Large countywide. Wallwork finished third in the General Election, a race where Democrats won three of the five Senate seats.  He finished more than 6,000 votes ahead of Democrat Martin Greenberg.

1971 Essex County state senate general election results

Another round of redistricting came in 1973 when the 25th legislative district was created.  For the first time, the state was divided into 40 legislative districts, each with one Senator and two Assemblymen.   His running mate was Assemblyman, later Governor, Thomas Kean.  In a Democratic landslide year, Wallwork defeated Roseland Councilman Joel Wasserman by 4,774 votes, 30,552 (54.24%) to 25,778 (45.76%).

He was re-elected in 1977 against Democrat Lewis J. Paper, a former U.S. Senate aide and White House intern.  Wallwork won by 12,421 votes, 35,517 (60.60%)	23,096 (39.40%).

Wallwork served as the Senate Minority Whip in 1978 and 1979, and as the Assistant Minority Leader in 1980 and 1981.

Candidate for Governor of New Jersey
Wallwork sought the Republican nomination for Governor of New Jersey in 1981, but finished fourth in the Republican primary with 16% of the vote.  He lost to Kean, who won the general election. During the campaign, Wallwork was reported to be the subject of an attempted assassination at a Veterans Administration hospital by a gunman disguised as a surgeon. The incident was determined by the FBI to be a hoax. In an unrelated indictment, federal prosecutors stated that the hospital chief of security had staged the attempt.

Results of the 1981 Republican primary for Governor of New Jersey

Source:

On March 2, 1993, Wallwork made a late and surprising entrance into the 1993 Republican gubernatorial primary.  The two leading candidates, both moderates, former New Jersey Board of Public Utilities President Christine Todd Whitman and former New Jersey Attorney General W. Cary Edwards, were being hammered after admitting that they had hired undocumented aliens as domestic servants in their homes.  This was an issue in early 1993, after President Clinton's first two nominees for U.S. Attorney General, Zoe Baird and Kimba Wood, were forced to withdraw their nominations after admitting that they hired undocumented aliens as nannies.  Wallwork billed himself as a conservative businessman, and pledged to "repeal every dime" of Governor Jim Florio's $2.8 billion tax increase.

Wallwork was hampered by his late start.  He admitted at his announcement that his campaign had just two staffers and that he had not yet raised enough to air his first television commercial.  "He's just not that well known.  He's deficient in name recognition, political base, support among county leadership, and I honestly don't know whether he can become a major candidate," Cliff Zukin, a professor of political science at the Eagleton Institute of Politics at Rutgers University told the New York Times.    He finished third, with 24% of the vote, and carried only Atlantic County.

Results of the 1993 Republican primary for Governor of New Jersey

Source:

Waterfront Commissioner
Governor Christine Todd Whitman appointed Wallwork to serve as the Commissioner for New Jersey on the Waterfront Commission of New York Harbor.

Family and retirement
He married the former Lark Lataner of Orange, New Jersey in 1965.  They have one daughter, Lyric Wallwork Winik, a book and magazine writer. His son-in-law is historian Jay Winik, the author of the New York Times #1 bestseller April 1865 (2001). Following his retirement from his business, he lived in Far Hills, New Jersey before relocating to Bethesda, Maryland.

Electoral history

References 

1930 births
Living people
Republican Party New Jersey state senators
People from East Orange, New Jersey
People from Far Hills, New Jersey
People from Millburn, New Jersey
People from Montclair, New Jersey
Politicians from Essex County, New Jersey
United States Military Academy alumni
Republican Party members of the New Jersey General Assembly
Military personnel from New Jersey